SPITFIRE is a DOS-based bulletin board system written by Mike Woltz, published by his company Buffalo Creek Software of West Des Moines, Iowa.

History
SPITFIRE was written in Turbo Pascal with assembly language routines.  It was released in 1987 as shareware, and had a moderate sized fanbase, only outnumbered by products such as RemoteAccess, TriBBS, PCBoard, Major BBS, and Wildcat! BBS.  It was possible to run multiple "nodes" of SPITFIRE under Microsoft Windows and OS/2; although, most SysOps preferred to use Quarterdeck's DESQview for this purpose.  SPITFIRE interfaced with message relaying systems such as FidoNet through third party utilities such as SHILOH, a QWK networking interfacing program, and BCSUTI, a Postlink-style networking interface.

SPITFIRE's most successful release (Version 3.2) came in 1992. By December 1992, there were 1523 registered copies of Spitfire still running, out of 2111 total registered to date. But by 1994, the World Wide Web had exploded on scene, and many SysOps began converting from running BBSes to becoming Internet service providers.   Woltz was unwilling to add Internet connectivity to the software, so SPITFIRE's usage dwindled significantly throughout the United States.  It was and is still used throughout the world, particularly in countries where high-speed Internet access is unavailable or banned.

Due to advances in technology, SPITFIRE can be run as a telnet BBS using a virtual FOSSIL driver and Telnet engine (SIO/VMODEM under OS/2, NetFoss, NetSerial or NetModem under Windows).

SPITFIRE (version 3.6) was updated in 1999 for Y2K compliance. Current release is SPITFIRE 3.7 (as of 1 January 2010) which is still supported by Buffalo Creek Software.

References

External links
Buffalo Creek Software

Bulletin board system software
DOS software